NNS Karaduwa (P102) is a Nigerian made 40 meter Seaward defense boat made by the Nigerian Navy in collaboration with Dorman Long Engineering which carried out most of the fabrication while instrumentation was carried out by Blueflag Inc.

History 

The Karaduwa SDB II fulfilled the Nigerian government's long aspiration of building, equipping and maintaining its own naval fleet without relying on external assistance.

The 30mm main gun is remotely operated. The P102 is used in the volatile Niger Delta region to combat piracy and to show the flag.

A new 50 meter Seaward defense boat III is being built in 2017–2018 under construction. It will be an enlarged version of the SDB II with more powerful weapons systems.

Overview 
The NNS Karaduwa (P-102) is a 40 meters naval vessel categorized as a 'Seaward Defense Boat' (SDB) a term used to describe a boat capable of operating from the littoral coastal waters down towards the deeper seas. In summary, it is a mid-shore patrol boat something short of a deep ocean-going ship but more capable than a coastal patrol boat.

It is about 38.9m long and can do 39 knots (45 mph; 72 km/h) with ease, a necessity when chasing marauding sea criminals.

Its armament panoply also reflects its role – fitted with a 30mm remotely operated gun, two 12.5mm multi-purpose heavy machine guns and a 40mm grenade launcher for taking out hostile speed boats.

It is currently deployed in the volatile Niger-Delta region enforcing the federal government maritime security mandate and showing the flag.

NNS Karaduwa Specifications 
Type: Seaward Defense Boat

Builder: Naval Dockyard Limited

Date of Commissioning: 15 December 2016

Motto: Searching for Peace

References

Military boats
Patrol vessels of the Nigerian Navy